Tiina O. Paananen (born 5 July 1972) is a Finnish retired ice hockey player. She was a member of the Finnish women's national ice hockey teams that won bronze medals at the IIHF Women's World Championships in 1997 and 1999.

Paananen played nine seasons in the Naisten SM-sarja with Kalevan Pallo Naiset (KalPa; 1993–1996), JyP HT Naiset and JYP Jyväskylä Naiset (1996–2000), and the Jyväskylän Hockey Cats (JyHC; 2000–2002). She won the Finnish Championship twice, first with JyP HT in 1997 and again in 1998, after the team had been renamed to JYP. Over the span of her SM-sarja career, Paananen tallied 130 goals and 237 points in 176 regular season games, averaging a blistering 1.35 points per game across nearly a decade of play.

Career statistics

International

References

External links
 

Living people
1972 births
Sportspeople from Jyväskylä
Finnish women's ice hockey forwards
Jyväskylän Hockey Cats players
JYP Jyväskylä Naiset players
JyP HT Naiset players
KalPa Naiset players
20th-century Finnish women